Mohoua is a small genus of three bird species endemic to New Zealand. The scientific name is taken from mohua – the Māori name for the yellowhead. Their taxonomic placement has presented problems: They have typically been placed in the whistler family, Pachycephalidae, but in 2013 it was established that they are best placed in their own family, Mohouidae.

All three species display some degree of sexual dimorphism in terms of size, with the males being the larger of the two sexes.  Mohoua are gregarious (more so outside the breeding season) and usually forage in groups. They also forage in mixed species flocks at times, frequently forming the nucleus of such flocks. Social organization and behaviour is well documented for all three Mohoua species; cooperative breeding has been observed in all three species and is common in the Whitehead and Yellowhead. The three species of this genus are the sole hosts for the long-tailed cuckoo which acts as a brood parasite upon them, pushing their eggs out of the nest and laying a single one of its own in their place so that they take no part in incubation of their eggs or in raising their young.

Species

References 

 Del Hoyo, J.; Elliot, A. & Christie D. (editors). (2007). Handbook of the Birds of the World. Volume 12: Picathartes to Tits and Chickadees. Lynx Edicions. 

 
Higher-level bird taxa restricted to New Zealand
Mohouidae
Bird genera
Taxa named by René Lesson